The Sabzevar University of New Technology (SUNT) is a public university in Sabzevar city at Razavi Khorasan province of Iran. Founded in 2011 in response to the increasing industrialization of Iran, SUNT adopted an industrial university model and stressed laboratory instruction in applied science and engineering. The university is a young one, with a campus that extends more than a mile alongside Sabzevar-Mashhad road. According to Ministry of Science, Research and Technology. SUNT offers 6 bachelor programs for more than 1000 students.

Departments 
Engineering Department

Courses 
Industrial Engineer
Information Technology Engineer
Math Engineer
Physics Engineer

Former Chancellors 
Prof. Javad Haddadnia (2011-2013)
Dr. Hosein Jalilvand (2013-2015)
Prof. Javad Haddadnia (2015-2016)
Dr. Abolghasem Amirahmadi (2016- )

See also
 Hakim Sabzevari University
 Sabzevar University of Medical Sciences
 Islamic Azad University of Sabzevar

References

External links
 Official website of SUNT

Universities in Iran
Sabzevar